The Share My World Tour was the first headlining concert tour by American recording artist  Mary J. Blige. It was launched in support of her multi-platinum third studio album Share My World (1997), and also contained material from her first and second studio albums What's the 411? (1992) and My Life (1994). The eight-month tour began on September 2, 1997 in the United States and continued through May 3, 1998. Concerts were held in North America and Europe.

Opening acts
Usher

Set list

"Announcer" 
"Real Love"
"You Remind Me"
"Reminisce"
"Sweet Thing"
"Mary Jane (All Night Long)"
"Love No Limit"
"Summer Madness"
"My Life"
"You Gotta Believe"
"Slow Down"
"Mary's Joint"
"I'm the Only Woman"
"Share My World"
"I’m Goin’ Down"
"Thank You Lord"
"I Can Love You"
"Keep Your Head" (Interlude)
"Everything"
"Seven Days"
"Not Gon' Cry"
Encore
"Missing You"

Notes
On select dates, Blige sang "Day Dreaming" and "Misty Blue" as part of the encore.

Band
Music Director/Bass: Lanar "Kern" Brantley
Keyboards: Luke Austin
Keyboards: Jeff Motley
Drums: Michael Clemons
Keyboards: Loren Dawson
Intro Announcer: Benny Pough
Background vocals: Dustin Adams, Joya Owens,  Chantell Jones, Michelle MatlockAdditional vocals: Cindy Mizelle, Sharon Bryant-Gallwey, Audrey Wheeler, Paulette McWilliams

Tour dates

Notes
 The first North American tour is the SummerFest1997 tour dates (except for the ones marked) along with Bone Thugs-N-Harmony, Aaliyah, Dru Hill, and Ginuwine. 
 All tour dates in 1997 and 1998 may not be listed for North America and Europe.

Live album

A live album entitled The Tour was released on July 28, 1998 by MCA Records, which reached No. 7 on Billboard's Top R&B Albums and No. 21 on Billboard 200  charts. The album was recorded during Blige's Share My World Tour at the Universal Amphitheater in Los Angeles, California.

Track listing
"Intro" – 0:35
"Real Love" – 1:30
"You Remind Me" – 0:37
"Reminisce" – 2:39
"Sweet Thing" – 4:53
"Mary Jane (All Night Long)" – 2:20
"Love No Limit" – 3;16
"Summer Madness" – 1:42 (Interlude)
"My Life" – 2:21
"You Gotta Believe" – 2:27
"Slow Down" – 1:51
"Mary's Joint" – 1:30
"I'm the Only Woman" – 2:04
"Share My World" – 1:59 (Interlude)
"I'm Goin' Down" – 3:16
"Thank You Lord" – 1:18 (Interlude)
"I Can Love You" – 3:44
"Keep Your Head" (Interlude) – 1:10
"Everything" – 6:34
"Seven Days" – 4:24
"Not Gon' Cry" – 5:37
"Missing You" – 6:47
"Day Dreaming" – 2:49
"Misty Blue" – 5:08
"A Dream" (Japan Bonus Track)

References

External links
 www.mjblige.com

1997 concert tours
1998 concert tours
Mary J. Blige concert tours